Harold Harris "Hy" Vandenberg (March 17, 1906 – July 31, 1994) born in Abilene, Kansas, was a pitcher for the Boston Red Sox (1935), New York Giants (1937–40) and Chicago Cubs (1944–45).

Vandenberg helped the Giants win the 1937 National League pennant and the Cubs win the 1945 NL pennant.

In 7 seasons Vandenberg had a 15–10 win–loss record, 90 games (22 started), 7 complete games, 1 shutout, 43 games finished, 5 saves, 291 innings pitched, 304 hits allowed, 166 runs allowed, 140 earned runs allowed, 17 home runs allowed, 128 walks allowed, 120 strikeouts, 6 hit batsmen, 4 wild pitches, 1,277 batters faced and a 4.32 ERA.

Vandenberg died of cancer in Bloomington, Minnesota at the age of 88.

References

External links

1906 births
1994 deaths
Baseball players from Kansas
People from Abilene, Kansas
Major League Baseball pitchers
Boston Red Sox players
New York Giants (NL) players
Chicago Cubs players
Deaths from cancer in Minnesota